Laura Cox may refer to:

 Laura Cox (born 1951), English High Court judge
 Laura Cox (musician) (born 1990), Anglo-French musician
 Laura Cox (politician) (born 1964), American politician

See Also
Lauren Cox (born 1998), American basketball player
Laurie D. Cox (1883–1968), American landscape architect